Jayadevitai Ligade is an Indian writer in the Kannada language. She became the president of Kannada Sahitya Parishattu. She fought to unify Sholapur with Karnataka on the linguistic grounds of majority Kannada-speaking community in the city. She has published several books on sharana sahitya in Kannada and Marathi, and wrote Siddarama purana, Sri Siddarameshwara.  She also helped by paying some donation in inventing and publishing Sharana Sahitya.

References 

Living people
Kannada-language writers
Women writers from Karnataka
Marathi-language writers
Year of birth missing (living people)